Sailing at the 2018 Summer Youth Olympics was held from 7 to 13 October at the Club Náutico San Isidro in San Isidro, Buenos Aires, Argentina.

Qualification

Each National Olympic Committee (NOC) can enter a maximum of 5 boats, 1 per each event. As hosts, Argentina will be given a boat to compete in all events provided that they compete in either the American Continental Tournament or World Championships. A further 6 quotas will be decided by the Tripartite Commission to be given in either the Techno 293+ or IKA Twin Tip Racing events, however four of them were unused and were reallocated to the next best nation from the respective World Championship. The remaining places shall be decided by qualification events, namely the six continental qualification tournaments and the World Championships for each boat. Boats qualified in the World Championships are prioritised over the continental events.

To be eligible to participate at the Youth Olympics athletes must have been born between 1 January 2000 and 31 December 2003.

Techno 293+

IKA Twin Tip Racing

Nacra 15

Medal summary

Medal table

Boys

Girls

Mixed

References

External links
Official Results Book – Sailing

 
2018 Summer Youth Olympics events
Youth Summer Olympics
2018
Sailing competitions in Argentina